Ficus pumila, commonly known as the creeping fig or climbing fig, is a species of flowering plant in the  mulberry family, native to East Asia (China, Japan, Vietnam) and naturalized in parts of the southeastern and south-central United States. It is also found in cultivation as a houseplant. The Latin specific epithet pumila means "dwarf", and refers to the very small leaves of the plant.

Description
The juvenile foliage is much smaller and thinner than mature leaves produced as the plant ages. The leaves are oval, cordate, asymmetrical, with opposite veins. It is creeping or can behave like a liana and also climb trees, rocks, etc. up to 4 m in height or more. The aerial roots secrete a translucent latex that hardens on drying, allowing the sticks to adhere to their support.

Cultivation
As the common name, "creeping fig" indicates, the plant has a creeping/vining habit and is often used in gardens and landscapes where it covers the ground and climbs up trees and walls. Therefore in temperate regions it is often seen as a houseplant. It is fast-growing and requires little in the way of care. It can be invasive when environmental conditions are favorable. Its secondary roots or tendrils can cause structural damage to certain buildings with fragile mortar or structures made of fragile materials.

It has gained the Royal Horticultural Society's Award of Garden Merit.

The plant requires the fig wasp Blastophaga pumilae for pollination, and is fed upon by larvae of the butterfly Marpesia petreus.

Varieties and cultivars
Ficus pumila var. awkeotsang —  awkeotsang creeping fig
Ficus pumila var. quercifolia —  oak leaf creeping fig
Ficus pumila 'Curly' — curly creeping fig; crinkled leaf form
Ficus pumila 'Variegata' and Ficus pumila 'Snowflake' — variegated creeping fig; variegated  foliage

Cuisine
The fruit of Ficus pumila var. awkeotsang is used in cuisine. In Taiwan, its fruit is turned inside out and dried. The seeds are scraped off and a gel is extracted from their surface with water and allowed to set and form a jelly known in Taiwan as aiyu jelly (or aiyuzi 愛玉子) and in Singapore as ice jelly (文頭雪).

Toxicity
Like other plant species in the family Moraceae, contact with the milky sap of Ficus pumila can cause phytophotodermatitis, a potentially serious skin inflammation. Although the plant is not poisonous per se, F. pumila is listed in the FDA Database of Poisonous Plants.

Gallery

References

External links

pumila
Flora of Eastern Asia
Flora of China
Flora of Vietnam
Edible fruits
Garden plants of Asia
Vines
House plants
Plants described in 1753
Taxa named by Carl Linnaeus